The 2013–14 Elon Phoenix men's basketball team represented Elon University during the 2013–14 NCAA Division I men's basketball season. The Phoenix, led by fifth year head coach Matt Matheny, played their home games at Alumni Gym and were members of the Southern Conference. They finished the season 18–14, 11–5 in SoCon play to finish in a tie for third place. They lost in the quarterfinals of the SoCon tournament to Western Carolina.

This was their last season as a member of the SoCon as they will join the Colonial Athletic Association in July, 2014.

Roster

Schedule

|-
!colspan=9 style="background:#910028; color:#CDB87D;"| Exhibition

|-
!colspan=9 style="background:#910028; color:#CDB87D;"| Regular season

|-
!colspan=9 style="background:#910028; color:#CDB87D;"| 2014 SoCon tournament

References

Elon Phoenix men's basketball seasons
Elon